Ben Christopher Brown (born 23 November 1988) is an English cricketer who plays for Hampshire County Cricket Club and played for England under-19s.

He is a wicket-keeper and right-handed batsman. Brown served as captain of Sussex (2018–2021) after Luke Wright stepped down from the role.

Brown was born in Crawley, West Sussex and educated at Ardingly College where he met his current wife, Katie Ryan-Brown.

After appearing regularly for Sussex Second XI, after making his debut in May 2004, he was selected for England under-19s tour of Malaysia in 2006/07 and also featured during the 'Test' and 'ODI' series with Pakistan in 2007.

In July 2007, Brown made his first-class debut for Sussex against Sri Lanka A scoring 46 off 25 balls and made his List A debut against Nottinghamshire in September 2007.

In the 2015 season, Brown was one of only two Sussex players to score over 1,000 runs in the County Championship; Brown scored 1,031 Championship runs at an average of 44.82, with 4 centuries. In December 2015, Brown signed a new contract to stay at Sussex until 2018, and was announced as the county's vice-captain. Sussex head coach Mark Davis described him as a "natural leader".

References

External links

1988 births
Living people
English cricket captains
English cricketers
Sussex cricket captains
Sussex cricketers
Hampshire cricketers
People educated at Ardingly College
Sportspeople from Crawley
Wicket-keepers